Bash Guneypeye is a village de facto in the Martakert Province of the self-proclaimed Republic of Artsakh, de jure in the Agdam District of Azerbaijan.

References 
 

Populated places in Martakert Province
Populated places in Aghdam District